Lieutenant-Colonel Thomas Frederic Tweed  (1891 – 30 April 1940) was a British soldier and novelist.

He was commissioned into the Lancashire Fusiliers. He won the Military Cross in World War I and at the age of 26 was named the youngest lieutenant colonel in the British Army at the time. He became a political adviser to David Lloyd George from 1927 until Tweed's death from a stroke.  Tweed was primarily famous for his novels, among which were Blind Mouths and Rinehard.  The latter was turned into the successful 1933 film Gabriel Over the White House, directed by Gregory LaCava and starring Walter Huston.

In the novel Rinehard and the film Gabriel Over the White House, the character of Pendie Molloy, the President's secretary  (played in the film by Karen Morley), is based on Frances Stevenson, Lloyd George's secretary and mistress, with whom Tweed also had an affair.

Works
Rinehard: A Melodrama of the Nineteen-Thirties (A. Barker, 1933)
 US edition, Gabriel Over the White House: A Novel of the Presidency (Farrar & Rinehart, 1933)
Blind Mouths (A. Barker, 1934); also known as Hungry Mouths
 US ed., Destiny's Man (Farrar & Rinehart, 1935). Dust wrapper for first UK edition of Blind Mouths designed by Margaret Macadam.

Further reading
Longford, Ruth. Frances, Countess Lloyd George: More Than a Mistress. Leominster, Herefordshire: Gracewing, 1996.

External links

1890 births
1940 deaths
Lancashire Fusiliers officers
British Army personnel of World War I
Recipients of the Military Cross
British male novelists
20th-century British novelists
20th-century British male writers